Pope John XIII of Alexandria was the 94th Coptic Orthodox Pope of Alexandria and Patriarch of the See of St. Mark. Little is known of him except for his long reign (over forty years), and that his patriarchate witnessed the downfall of the Mamluk Sultanate and the rise of Ottoman power in Egypt.

15th-century Coptic Orthodox popes of Alexandria
1524 deaths
16th-century Coptic Orthodox popes of Alexandria